The 2019–20 season was Dunfermline Athletic's fourth season in the Scottish Championship, having finished 7th in the 2018–19 season.

On 13 March 2020 all SPFL leagues were indefinitely suspended due to the COVID-19 coronavirus outbreak. On 8 April, with the pandemic continuing, the SPFL board proposed to curtail the 2019–20 Championship season and use the points per game earned by each team to date as the final standings. The plan was approved on 15 April, meaning the league was declared over.

Squad list

Results & fixtures

Pre-season

Scottish Championship

Scottish League Cup

Table

Matches

Scottish Challenge Cup

Squad statistics

Appearances and goals
During the 2019–20 season, Dunfermline used twenty-nine different players in competitive matches. The table below shows the number of appearances and goals scored by each player. Defender Aaron Comrie made the most appearances, playing thirty-four out of a possible 35 games. Kevin Nisbet scored the most goals, with twenty-three in all competitions.

|-
|colspan="14"|Players away from the club on loan:

|-
|colspan="14"|Players who appeared for Dunfermline Athletic but left during the season:

|}

Goalscorers
During the 2019–20 season, sixteen Dunfermline players scored 57 goals in all competitions.

Club statistics

League table

Results by round

Results Summary

Transfers

First team

Players in

Players out

Loans in

Loans out

Reserve team

Players in

Players out

Loans out

Contract extensions

References

Dunfermline Athletic F.C. seasons
Dunfermline Athletic